Dentville, also known as Pine Bluff, is an unincorporated community in Copiah County, Mississippi, United States.

History
The community was originally known as Pine Bluff, a descriptive name for a bluff over Bayou Pierre. A post office already existed with the name Pine Bluff in Mississippi, so the community was named Dentville in honor of Warren Dent, a storeowner and the community's first postmaster.

A post office operated under the name Dentville from 1887 to 1906.

Notable person
 Robert Charles, spree killer. Sparked the Robert Charles riots in New Orleans.

References

Unincorporated communities in Copiah County, Mississippi
Unincorporated communities in Mississippi